Jurčević is a common Croatian surname. It may refer to:

Josip Jurčević (b. 1951), Croatian historian and politician
Lana Jurčević (b. 1984), Croatian pop singer
Mladen Jurčević (b. 1983), Bosnian footballer
Nikola Jurčević (b. 1966), retired Croatian football player and manager
Ivan Jurčević (b. 2000),  Croatian basketball player

See also
Jurić, a surname
Đurčević, a surname

Croatian surnames
Patronymic surnames